Mill Lake may refer to:

Mill Lake Park
Mill Lake (British Columbia)
Mill Lake (Idaho)